The 1908–09 season was the 15th in the history of Southern Football League. Northampton Town won Division One and Croydon Common finished top of Division Two. No clubs applied for election to the Football League.

Division One

A total of 21 teams contested the division, including 18 sides from previous season and three new teams.

Team promoted from 1907–08 Division Two:
 Southend United
Newly elected teams:
 Exeter City
 Coventry City

Division Two

A total of seven teams contested the division, including three sides from the previous season and four newly elected teams.

Newly elected teams:
 2nd Grenadier Guards
 Chesham Town
 Depot Battalion RE
 South Farnborough Athletic

References

1908-09
1908–09 in English association football leagues